John Thomas Nolan (born February 24, 1978) is an American musician best known as the guitarist and co-lead vocalist of Taking Back Sunday, and the former lead singer, pianist, and guitarist of Straylight Run.

Nolan left Taking Back Sunday in 2003 along with bassist Shaun Cooper, with whom he formed Straylight Run. During March 2010, he and Cooper rejoined Taking Back Sunday, reforming the Tell All Your Friends-era lineup. Nolan is also a solo artist and has recorded an album called Height and "Live at Looney Tunes."

Biography 
John Thomas Nolan was born in Baltimore, Maryland, then at three, moved to Rockville Centre, Nassau County, New York, United States. As member of the band Taking Back Sunday he performs lead guitar, vocals and keyboards, in Straylight Run he performs lead vocals, piano, and guitar.

Taking Back Sunday 
In 1999, John was recruited into Taking Back Sunday by Jesse Lacey. He later would invite Adam Lazzara to join the band. In 2002 the band would release their debut album, Tell All Your Friends. He would leave the band in 2003 to pursue a different musical direction, along with personal differences with other band members.

In late March 2010, he and Shaun Cooper rejoined Taking Back Sunday. In 2011, the band released a self-titled album that peaked at number 17 on the Billboard 200, the first since Nolan's rejoining. In 2014, the band released Happiness Is, which debuted at number 10 in the Billboard 200 and went to number 1 on Billboard's top independent albums chart, becoming Nolan's highest-charting album.

Straylight Run 
In 2003, John would go on to form Straylight Run with his sister Michelle DaRosa, drummer Will Noon and former Taking Back Sunday bassist Shaun Cooper. In 2004 the band released their self-titled debut album which peaked at number 100 in the Billboard 200, and number 4 in the Billboard Independent Albums chart.

From 2004 to 2009 Straylight Run would release two albums and four EP's. The band's 2007 record, The Needles The Space would debut at number 72 in the Billboard 200, marking the band's highest position on that chart. The band's 2005 Prepare to be Wrong EP charted at number 168.

On February 16, 2010, it was announced that Straylight Run was on "hiatus", with a live album to be released in the future.

Solo 
Nolan announced on his MySpace blog on May 1, 2009 that he had decided to work on some solo material, some of which can be found on his MySpace and Bandcamp profiles. His first solo album, Height, was released on October 27, 2009 on Doghouse Records. John toured the Midwest and east coast with Person L and Brian Bonz in November and in January with support from Gabriel the Marine and Ocean is Theory.

In 2014 Nolan provided the song "Here Comes the Wolf" to the soundtrack of the Jason Michael Brescia film, Bridge and Tunnel. The song was nominated for several awards in the film festival circuit, and was the recipient of "Best Original Song" at the 2014 Long Island International Film Expo. He also provides backup vocals and co-songwriting credit on the Gabriel the Marine track "Round and Round."

On July 27, 2015 Nolan released his second solo album, Sad, Strange, Beautiful Dream.  The album was made possible by a successful PledgeMusic campaign.

Personal 
Nolan currently lives in the NoDa neighborhood of Charlotte, North Carolina with wife Camille, son John, and daughter Greta. Nolan lives down the road from bandmate Adam Lazzara, who is a North Carolina native.

Discography 
 With Taking Back Sunday
Taking Back Sunday EP (2001)
Lullaby EP (2001)
 Tell All Your Friends (2002)
 Taking Back Sunday (2011)
 Happiness Is (2014)
 Tidal Wave (2016)

 With Straylight Run
 Straylight Run (2004)
 Prepare To Be Wrong EP (2005)
 The Needles the Space (2007)
 Un Mas Dos EP (2008)
 About Time EP (2009)

 Solo
 The Collaboration Experiment (2009)
 Height (2009)
 Live at Southpaw (2009)
 Live at Looney Tunes CDs (2010)
 Songs I Wrote (2010)
 Songs I Didn't Write (2010)
 Sad Strange Beautiful Dream (2015)
 Abendigo (2018)

Videography
Drinking Your Way To Confidence
Street Robbery Blues (Punks in Vegas Session)
American Nightclub 1999 (Punks in Vegas Session)

Gear
It has been noted that John uses a Fender Telecaster Deluxe due to its feel, but prefers the sound of a Gibson Les Paul. He uses a Big Bite pedal into a Marshall JCM800 amplifier to create his crunch tone. He also uses a Fender '72 Telecaster Thinline on occasion.

References

External links
 John Nolan's website
 Official Straylight Run Website
 Straylight Run's profile at PureVolume
 Nolan's 2011 Taking Back Sunday Guitar Rig. GuitarGeek.com

American rock guitarists
American male guitarists
American rock singers
1978 births
Living people
Singers from New York (state)
Musicians from Baltimore
People from Rockville Centre, New York
Guitarists from New York (state)
21st-century American singers
21st-century American guitarists
21st-century American male singers
Doghouse Records artists